Victor II may refer to:

 Pope Victor II
 Victor II (bishop of Chur)
 Victor II, Prince of Anhalt-Bernburg-Schaumburg-Hoym
 Victor II, Duke of Ratibor
 Victor-class submarine
 Simonini Victor 2, an Italian aircraft engine